Concord Depot is a commuter rail station on the MBTA Commuter Rail Fitchburg Line at 90 Thoreau Street in downtown Concord, Massachusetts. As well as providing commuter service to Boston, the station offers tourists access to the various popular historic sites in Concord. It has two side platforms, which are low-level and not handicapped accessible, serving the line's two tracks. Although the station is within walking distance of the most heavily populated area of Concord, a small number of free parking spots are also available.

History

Fitchburg Railroad service from Concord to Boston began in June 1844, and has continued since. When he lived at Walden Pond, Henry David Thoreau complained that the village's schedule was set by the times of arrivals and departures at the station. Although the Fitchburg Line went through a series of contractions due to funding issues in the 1960s and 1970s, service to Concord was never interrupted.

The current station building was built in the Queen Anne style in the 1890s, replacing the wooden station from 1844. The new station was damaged by fire in 1895 and substantially rebuilt. When built, it was a squat hip-roofed station similar to other stations on the line. A control tower on the trackside roof was added later.

In 1958, the station building was purchased from the B&M at a cost of $35,000. It was converted for use as a gift shop by 1962. By 1977, it was subdivided for use as offices, a restaurant, and retail space.

The depot was later modified during the 20th century and scarcely resembles the original. The trackside doors and windows have been boarded over, replaced by a mural painted in the early 1980s. Large side wings have been added, and the building converted for retail use. The circa-1907 express office is present just to the west and also in retail use; a freight house east of the station was demolished in 1991.

References

External links
MBTA - Concord

 Station from Sudbury Road from Google Maps Street View
 Station from Thoreau Street from Google Maps Street View

Stations along Boston and Maine Railroad lines
MBTA Commuter Rail stations in Middlesex County, Massachusetts
Railway stations in the United States opened in 1844